This is a list of Afghan Americans, including both original immigrants from Afghanistan who obtained American nationality and their American descendants. To be included in this list, the person must have a Wikipedia article showing that they are Afghan American or must have independent references showing that they are Afghan American and are notable.

Academia and science 
 Ali Ahmad Jalali (born 1940, Kabul), Distinguished Professor at the National Defense University in Washington, D.C.; former Afghan ambassador to Germany
 Mohammad Qayoumi (born 1952, Kabul), former President of San Jose State University
 Nake M. Kamrany (born 1934, Kabul), professor at the University of Southern California (USC) and economist
 Adib Farhadi (born 1972, Kabul), assistant professor at University of South Florida and coordinator of USF's Executive Education Program; the former Afghanistan Deputy Minister of Commerce
 Nazif Shahrani (born Badakhshan), professor of anthropology at Indiana University
 Ishaq Shahryar (born 1936, Kabul), Afghan Ambassador to the United States from 2002 to 2003

Arts and entertainment 

 Leena Alam (born 1978, Kabul), actress in television, film, and theater, human rights activist
 Sonia Nassery Cole (born 1965, Kabul), human rights activist, filmmaker, and author
 Zohra Daoud (born 1954, Kabul), television host and Miss Afghanistan 1974
 Josh Gad (born 1981), actor, comedian, and singer whose father is an Afghan Jew
 Sameer Asad Gardezi, screenwriter and television writer
 Mariam Ghani (born 1978), multi-media visual artist, photographer, filmmaker, human rights activist; of Afghan–Lebanese descent
 Azita Ghanizada (born 1979, Kabul), actress and television host
 Bahari Ibaadat (born 1993, Kabul), model, Miss Afghanistan 2014
 Donnie Keshawarz (born 1969), Canadian-born American stage, film and television actor; of Afghani–Canadian descent
 Mahaley Patel (born 1987), actress, singer, songwriter; her father is from Afghanistan
 Aman Mojadidi (born 1971), visual artist
 Vida Samadzai (born 1978, Kabul), actress, model, Miss Afghanistan 2003, and Beauty for a Cause of Miss Earth 2003
 Jawed Wassel (1959–2001, Kabul), filmmaker
 Noor Wodjouatt, classical Indian musician and television producer, founder of Zarin TV

Business 

 Hafizullah Emadi (born Shibar), independent scholar and development consultant for Focus Humanitarian Assistance
 Masuda Sultan (born 1978), entrepreneur, international human rights advocate, and memoirist

Literature 

 Tamim Ansary (born 1948, Kabul), author
 Khaled Hosseini (born 1965, Kabul), author of three books including the Kite Runner, activist, humanitarian, and UNHCR goodwill ambassador

Media and journalism 

 Zakia Kohzad (born Mazar-e-Sharif), former television news anchor for Kabul TV
 Nabil Miskinyar (born 1948, Kabul), television anchor for Ariana Afghanistan
 Fariba Nawa (born 1973, Herat), journalist and author

Music 

 Sonita Alizadeh (born 1996, Herat), rapper and activist
 Ehsan Aman (born 1959, Lashkargah), musician
 Farhad Darya (born 1962, Kabul), musician
 Qader Eshpari (born 1967, Kabul), soft rock singer
 Qais Essar, a rabab musician, songwriter
 Naim Popal (born 1954, Kabul), musician
 Haidar Salim, musician
 Farid Zoland (born 1951, Kabul), musician

Politics and civil service 

 Ashraf Ghani (born 1949, Logar), 14th President of Afghanistan
 Zalmay Khalilzad (born 1951, Mazar-i-Sharif), United States Ambassador to the United Nations from 2007 to 2009
 Safiya Wazir (born 1991, Baghlan), New Hampshire State Representative 2018-present
 Nadia Hashimi (born 1977), Democratic congressional candidate for the United States House of Representatives for Maryland's 6th congressional district, pediatrician, and novelist
 Laili Helms, former Taliban supporter and public speaker
 Ahmed Wali Karzai (born 1961, Karz), politician in Afghanistan until his death in 2011
 Ahmad Yusuf Nuristani (born 1947, Nuristan), politician, Governor of Herat Province in Afghanistan from 2009–2010
 Stephen J. Townsend (born 1959), West German-born American four-star general of Afghan–German descent, commanding general of U.S. forces during the War on ISIS / Operation Inherent Resolve

Other 
 Wallace Fard Muhammad (c.1877–c.1934), founder of the Nation of Islam, mentor of Elijah Muhammad
 Niloofar Rahmani (born 1992, Logar), former Afghan female pilot
 Shaesta Waiz (born 1987), Afghan-born pilot and the first female certified civilian pilot, and the youngest woman to fly solo around the world in a single-engine aircraft
 Ahmad Khan Rahami (born 1988, Kandahar), terrorist
 Najibullah Zazi (born 1985, Paktia), a convicted Al-Qaeda member

See also
 List of Afghans
 Pashtuns
 Pashtun diaspora

References

Americans
Afghan
Afghan